Michaelides  is a Greek surname.

Alekos Michaelides
Alex Michaelides, writer
Alexis Michaelides
Andreas Michaelides
Konstantinos Michaelides
Solon Michaelides
Stavros Michaelides
Tony Michaelides
Vasilis Michaelides
Andonis Michaelides, known as Mick Karn

Greek-language surnames